Suranjan Das Road is a road in Bengaluru, India. It runs from Old Madras Road at one end to Old Airport Road at the other.

History
The road was built in the 1940s to connect Old Airport Road and Old Madras Road.

Etymology
The entire 4.1-km stretch of this Road is named after Group Captain Suranjan Das's, a great test pilot who lived and died at the forefront of Indian aviation. He joined the No 8 Fighter-Bomber Squadron in 1943 and was known to be adept in solving technical snags. He also participated in operations in Kashmir in 1947–48. It was 1949 that sparked off his life-long connection with Bengaluru. Having acquired training from the Empire Test Pilot School in the UK, Das was instrumental in testing the Hindustan Trainer2 (HT-2) at Hindustan Aeronautics (HAL). Das was killed on January 10, 1970 when the HF-24 Mk.IR prototype he was flying crashed. A number of causes were attributed, including the failure of reheat mode of one of the engines and the inadvertent opening of the canopy during the takeoff.

Road widening
Linking the hyper busy Old Madras and Old Airport roads, Suranjan Das Road had caught the “widening” brigade's attention pretty early in 2006. The actual work began in 2012 only. 183 Trees were uprooted to make room for road widening which irked the residents who claimed that the popular Green canopy was lost forever. But eight years after a private-public deal to upgrade it to a four-lane, fully concretized thoroughfare, the road remained unfinished  a chaotic, unfinished mess till 2014.

Location
BM Kaval, ADE, New Thippasandra, Jeevanbimanagar are the localities situated to the West of the Road. Suggaguntepalya, BEML, Vimanapura, GM Palya are located to the East.

References

Roads in Bangalore